This is an incomplete list of ghost towns in Delaware.

List by county

Kent County 

Woodland Beach

New Castle County 

 Glenville

Sussex County 
 Banning
 New Market
 Owens Station
 Saint Johnstown
 Woodland
 Zwaanendael (first settlement in the state)

See also 

 Queen Anne's Railroad

References

 
Delaware
Ghost towns